Gullringen is a locality situated in Vimmerby Municipality, Kalmar County, Sweden with 541 inhabitants in 2010.

Gullringen is best known for its football team, Gullringens GoIF, and the house maker, Gullringshus.

References

External links 

Populated places in Kalmar County
Populated places in Vimmerby Municipality